KN-62 is a derivative of isoquinolinesulfonamide, it is a selective, specific and cell permeable inhibitor of Ca2+/calmodulin-dependent kinase type II (CaMK II) with IC50 of 900nM, charactered by hydrophobicity. KN-62 also potently inhibits the purinergic receptor P2X7.

Inhibitory mechanism on CaMK II
KN-62 blocks the combination of CaM and CaMK II by binding directly to the calmodulin binding site of the enzyme, disenables CaMK II's autophosphorylation, consequently leading inactivation. Kinetic analysis exhibits that this inhibitory effect of KN-62 is competitive with respect to calmodulin. Since KN-62 binds to the calmodulin binding site of CaMK II, KN-62 doesn't inhibit activity of autophosphorylated CaMK II.
Besides, KN-62 also acts as a potent non-competitive antagonist at the purinergic receptor P2RX7 with IC50 of 15nM.

References

Protein biosynthesis
Receptor antagonists
Sulfonamides